David Thomas Nish (born 5 May 1960) is a Scottish businessman. He is the former chief executive (CEO) of Standard Life, a British long term savings and investment company.

Early life
He was born and brought up in Barrhead, the son of a Royal Mail sorting office manager father (who died from a cerebral haemorrhage when Nish was just 17) and nurse mother. He was educated at 
Paisley Grammar School and the University of Glasgow, where he graduated with a bachelor's degree in accountancy.

Career
He was CEO of Standard Life from November 2009 until August 2015, having joined on 1 November 2006 as group finance director. He was previously a partner at PricewaterhouseCoopers and finance director of ScottishPower.

Personal life
Nish comes from Glasgow, and still lives there. He and his wife Caroline have been married since 1983 and have two adult children.

References

1960 births
Living people
British accountants
British chief executives
British corporate directors
Alumni of the University of Glasgow
People educated at Paisley Grammar School
People from Barrhead